Yercaud is a Hill station in Salem District, in Tamil Nadu, India.

History 

Stone-age implements have been found from the ancient shrine located near Shevaroy Hills (also known as Shevarayan Hills), which is about 5 km from the Yercaud lake.

Geography
It is located in the Shevaroys range of hills in the Eastern Ghats. 
The total extent of Yercaud Taluk is 382.67 km2, including reserve forest.

Topography 

Climate

Demographics

Population 
Yercaud has population app. 40,000 people during the 2001 census period. Scheduled Tribal population of Yercaud is 24,449 people.

The total density of the population is 102 people per km2. The increase of population at the rate of 20% and Yercaud being a Rural township it lacks any urban population.
The literacy rate in Yercaud is 62% out of the total population.

Government and politics  
The entire Taluk is administered as a township. Yercaud also has a village council.

Yercaud has an assembly constituency (Scheduled Tribal Area) is part of Kallakurichi (Lok Sabha constituency).

Transport 
Yercaud is situated in Salem district, Tamil Nadu. The nearest city is Salem, 32 km away.

By Air  
The nearest airports are Salem Airport at a distance of 38 km.

By Rail  
The nearest railway station is Salem Junction – 38 km.

By Road  
TNSTC – Salem operates the buses from Yercaud to major cities. Alternatively, it can also be accessed from Dharmapuri via Kanavaipudur.

Education

CBSE schools
Emerald Valley Public School
Sacred heart school
Shevaroys valley school
Sri Seshaas international public school
St. Charles school

Cisce school
Montfort School, Yercaud is a residential institution dating back to 1 June 1917.

College
Shevaroys college of arts and science

References

External links

Tourist attractions in Salem district
Cities and towns in Salem district
Hill stations in Tamil Nadu